Common heath is a common name for several plants and may refer to:

Calluna vulgaris, native to Europe
Epacris impressa, native to Australia

See also
Ematurga atomaria, a species of moth native to Europe